Moneilema rugosissimum is a species of beetle in the family Cerambycidae. It was described by Casey in 1924.

References

Moneilemini
Beetles described in 1924